Harem Girl is a 1952 American comedy film directed by Edward Bernds and written by Edward Bernds and Elwood Ullman. The film stars Joan Davis, Peggie Castle, Arthur Blake, Paul Marion, Donald Randolph and Henry Brandon. The film was released on January 21, 1952, by Columbia Pictures.

Plot

Cast          
 Joan Davis as Susie Perkins
 Peggie Castle as Princess Shareen
 Arthur Blake as Abdul Nassib
 Paul Marion as Majeed
 Donald Randolph as Jamal
 Henry Brandon as Hassan Ali
 Minerva Urecal as Aniseh
 Peter Mamakos as Sarab
 John Dehner as Khalil

References

External links
 

1952 films
American comedy films
1952 comedy films
Columbia Pictures films
Films directed by Edward Bernds
American black-and-white films
1950s English-language films
1950s American films